This is a list of launches made by the Long March rocket family between 2010 and 2019.

Launch statistics

Rocket configurations

Launch outcomes

Launch history

2010

|}

2011

|}

2012

|}

2013

|}

2014

|}

2015

|}

2016 

|}

2017

|}

2018

|}

2019

|}

References

Sources 

 
 
 

Space program of the People's Republic of China
Long March